Gabriel Robert (5 March 1920 – 15 May 2003) was a French football player and coach. He played for the France Olympic team at the 1948 Summer Olympics.

After his playing career, he became a coach with Hyères, Touon, Lyon, Valenciennes and coached France at the 1976 Summer Olympics.

References

External links
 

1920 births
2003 deaths
French footballers
Association football defenders
Olympic footballers of France
Footballers at the 1948 Summer Olympics
French football managers
SC Toulon managers
Olympique Lyonnais managers
Valenciennes FC managers
Ligue 1 managers